Jura Sud Foot is a football club based in Lavans-lès-Saint-Claude, France. They play at the Stade Municipal de Moirans in Lavans-lès-Saint-Claude. The club was founded in 1991. Currently they play in Championnat National 2 (fourth tier).

History
 The club was founded in 1991 by merger of three clubs: AS Moirans-en-Montagne (established 1920), the CS Molinges / Chassal (1940) and the Agreement Lavans-lès-Saint-Claude/Saint-Lupicin (1985).
 2009 new merger with St Claude Val Biel

Jura Sud reached the 1/16-finals of the 1998–99 Coupe de France and the 2014–15 Coupe de France.

Current squad

Coaches
 2002–2004: Diego Garzitto
 2006–2007: Eric Fouda
 2007–2008: Diego Garzitto
 2008–2009: Vincent Baby and from 1 October 2008, Sebastien Cuvier
 2009–2012: Sébastien Cuvier
 2012–: Pascal Moulin

References

External links
  Official club site

1991 establishments in France
Association football clubs established in 1991
Sport in Jura (department)
Football clubs in Bourgogne-Franche-Comté